1 Chronicles 15 is the fifteenth chapter of the Books of Chronicles in the Hebrew Bible or the First Book of Chronicles in the Old Testament of the Christian Bible. The book is compiled from older sources by an unknown person or group, designated by modern scholars as "the Chronicler", and had the final shape established in late fifth or fourth century BCE. This chapter contains the account of successful transportation of the Ark of the Covenant to the City of David in Jerusalem. The whole chapter belongs to the section focusing on the kingship of David (1 Chronicles 9:35 to 29:30).

Text
This chapter was originally written in the Hebrew language. It is divided into 29 verses.

Textual witnesses
Some early manuscripts containing the text of this chapter in Hebrew are of the Masoretic Text tradition, which includes the Aleppo Codex (10th century), and Codex Leningradensis (1008).

There is also a translation into Koine Greek known as the Septuagint, made in the last few centuries BCE. Extant ancient manuscripts of the Septuagint version include Codex Vaticanus (B; B; 4th century), Codex Sinaiticus (S; BHK: S; 4th century), Codex Alexandrinus (A; A; 5th century) and Codex Marchalianus (Q; Q; 6th century).

Old Testament references
: .
: .

Preparing to move the Ark (15:1–13)

The three traditional priest families, Gershom, Kohath, and Merari, listed in a different order, together with the families of Hebron and Uzziel (Kohath's sons according to ), and Elizaphan. David announced his intentions to the head priests and Levites (verse 11), calling upon them to sanctify themselves (verse 12; cf. Exodus 19:14-15) while referring back to the failed first attempt (verse 13).

Verse 11
And David called for Zadok and Abiathar the priests, and for the Levites, for Uriel, Asaiah, and Joel, Shemaiah, and Eliel, and Amminadab,
"Zadok and Abiathar": two priests who appeared together during the first of part of David's reign (1 Chronicles 15:29, 35; 18:16; 19:11; 20:25); representing the major priestly families ("sons of Aaron").(cf. 1 Chronicles 6:4ff, and 1 Chronicles 24:3). Zadok is always mentioned first as being the descendant of Eleazar the third son of Aaron, while Abiathar (Ahimelech) was descended from Ithamar, the fourth son of Aaron (1 Chronicles 24:1; 1 Chronicles 24:3) through Eli (1 Kings 2:27). The double priesthood came to an end in the reign of Solomon (1 Kings 2:27; 1 Kings 2:35).

Verse 13
For because you did not do it the first time, the Lord our God broke out against us, because we did not consult Him about the proper order.”
" For because you did not do it the first time": could be rendered as "for because on the first occasion it was not you," referring to the heads of the Levitical houses—the first time the ark was carried up by Uzza and Ahio, the sons of Abinadab (2 Samuel 6:3). The phrase "lĕmabbārîshônāh" ("because at the first") is only found here.
"Broke out against us" is using the verb "perez" (as in 1 Chronicles 13:11 (three times); 14:11; cf. Exodus 19:22). 
The observance of ordinance is noted in 1 Chronicles 15:15, following Numbers 7:9.

Moving the Ark to Jerusalem (15:14–29)

The passage includes details of Levitical duties (verses 16–24) and the Chronicler emphasizes that the relevant instructions were carried out carefully. Musical instruments are prominently described in this passage (cf. 2 Samuel 6:12–15) as well as in ritual liturgies throughout the Chronicles (1 Chronicles 16:42; 2 Chronicles 5:13; 7:6; 23:13; 34:12). The number of sacrifices corresponds with the contemporary practices (see e.g. Numbers 23:1; Ezekiel 45:23; Job 42:8).

Verse 29
And it came to pass, as the ark of the covenant of the Lord came to the city of David, that Michal, the daughter of Saul looking out at a window saw king David dancing and playing: and she despised him in her heart. 
"Michal, the daughter of Saul": is never declared as David's wife in Chronicles. Her showing of contempt for the ark represent the attitude of Saul's family (1 Chronicles 13:3). This verse summarizes 2 Samuel 6:16–23, omitting the mocking of David by Michal.

Illustration

See also

Related Bible parts: Exodus 19, Deuteronomy 10, Deuteronomy 31, Numbers 7, 2 Samuel 6, 1 Chronicles 3, 1 Chronicles 13, 1 Chronicles 14

References

Sources

External links
 Jewish translations:
 Divrei Hayamim I - I Chronicles - Chapter 15 (Judaica Press) translation [with Rashi's commentary] at Chabad.org
 Christian translations:
 Online Bible at GospelHall.org (ESV, KJV, Darby, American Standard Version, Bible in Basic English)
 First Book of Chronicles Chapter 15. Bible Gateway

15